Ellis Luke Hudson (born 4 February 1999) is an English professional footballer who plays for Silsden, as a left winger.

Early and personal life
Born in Bradford, Hudson attended Bingley Grammar School.

Career
Hudson joined Bradford City at the age of 8. He made his senior debut on 30 August 2016, in an EFL Trophy game against Stoke under-23s. He turned professional in September 2016, signing a two-year contract. Hudson joined Harrogate Town on loan in November 2017, alongside teammate Lachlan Barr. He then moved on loan to Guiseley in March 2018.

He was offered a new contract by Bradford City at the end of the 2017–18 season. He left the club in December 2018 by mutual consent.

He moved to the United States to play college soccer for the Florida Tech Panthers.

He joined Silsden in September 2022 after a spell at Bingley Town.

Career statistics

References

1999 births
Living people
English footballers
Bradford City A.F.C. players
Harrogate Town A.F.C. players
Guiseley A.F.C. players
Association football wingers
English Football League players
Footballers from Bradford
English expatriate footballers
English expatriates in the United States
Expatriate soccer players in the United States
Silsden A.F.C. players